The USL Second Division (commonly referred to as USL-2) was a professional men's soccer league in the United States, operated by United Soccer Leagues (USL). It was at the third tier of soccer in the United States, behind Major League Soccer (top tier) and the USL First Division (second tier), and one step up from the USL Premier Development League and other leagues in the fourth tier.

History
In 1995 the United States Interregional Soccer League (USISL), the de facto second tier of American soccer at the time,  the league changed its name to the United States International Soccer League, and split into two leagues, one professional and one amateur. The professional league, initially called the USISL Pro League, was a FIFA-sanctioned Division 3 league, while the amateur league, (the 'Premier League'), was given Division 4 status and would later go on to become the USL Premier Development League. The first champions of the new USISL Pro League were the Long Island Rough Riders, who beat Minnesota Thunder 2–1 in the championship game.

In 1996, the USISL established a new USISL Select League. The strongest USISL Pro League teams joined this new league, which was given Division 2 status alongside the existing A-League, while the remainder of the teams (plus expansion teams) remained at Division 3 level. Charleston Battery became the league's second champions in this year, beating the Charlotte Eagles in a penalty shootout in the 1996 USISL Pro League championship game.

In 1997 the league changed its name to the USISL D-3 Pro League to further distinguish itself from the A-League, and then in 1999 the umbrella USISL changed its name to the United Soccer Leagues (USL), and as such the Pro League officially became known as the USL D3 Pro League. In 2003 the name was changed again to the USL Pro Select League, but during the season had to be changed to the USL Pro Soccer League for to legal reasons. In 2005 the league took its final name as the USL Second Division.

The USL Second Division dissolved following the 2010 season to make way for USL Pro, which combined the existing USL First and Second divisions and began play in 2011.

List of current and former member clubs 
A total of 102 clubs have competed in USL-2.

Below is a list of clubs in the USL Second Division between 2005 and 2010 along with their current league affiliation (if any)

Past champions

Championships by team

References

 
Second
Defunct soccer leagues in the United States
Sports leagues established in 1995
Sports leagues disestablished in 2010
1995 establishments in the United States
2010 disestablishments in the United States